Pyongyang Sports Club is a North Korean organization of education specialty with several departments.  This organization is based in Pyongyang and plays at the Kim Il-sung Stadium. As the sports club of the Workers' Party of Korea and Government of Pyongyang, Pyongyang SC is the largest sports club not affiliated with a state ministry.

Football is the most popular department in this organization. The men are presently playing in the DPR Korea Premier Football League, the highest football league in North Korea. The club's nickname is Chollima. Although in the rest of the world Chollima is used to refer to the North Korean national team, references to Chollima or "the Chollima football team" in North Korean sports reporting usually refers to Pyongyang's football team.

History
This organization was founded by Kim Il-sung on 30 April 1956.

Rivalries
Pyongyang's primary rival is April 25 - known as "the Pyongyang Derby".

Current players

Managers
 Ri Chang-hun (2011–2012)
 Choe Yong-son (2012–2013)
 Ri Jong-man (2013–)

Achievements

Domestic
DPR Korea Premier Football League: 5
 1991, 2004, 2005, 2008, 2009

Paektusan Prize: 2
 2007
 2016

Poch'ŏnbo Torch Prize: 4
 2015
 2010
 2005
SF 2014

DPR Korea Championship: 1
 2004

International
IFA Shield: 1
 1973

Other sports
The club has branches in several other sports, including ice hockey.

Notes

References

 
Football clubs in North Korea
Association football clubs established in 1956
Football clubs in Pyongyang
Multi-sport clubs in North Korea
1956 establishments in North Korea